Louisiana Highway 70 (LA 70) is a state highway in Louisiana that serves St. Mary, St. Martin, Assumption, and Ascension parishes. It is primarily a two-lane highway that spans .

Route description
LA 70 begins at an exit from U.S. Highway 90 in Morgan City. Within the same interchange, US 90 Business and LA 182 pass underneath US 90. LA 70 then heads north into Assumption Parish, where it runs through Pierre Part. In Paincourtville, LA 70 intersects LA 1 via Louisiana Highway 70 Spur, a  connector road. LA 70 then continues northeastward through rural Ascension Parish as a two-lane, undivided road. LA 70 widens to a four lane, undivided road at an intersection with LA 3089. LA 70 then crosses the Mississippi River via the Sunshine Bridge. LA 70 then narrows back to a two lane undivided road after intersecting LA 44 and continues northeastward until it ends at an intersection with LA 22, just south of Interstate 10.

History

Originally, LA 70 was a much shorter route serving only Assumption Parish and only approximately 17 miles in length.  Until the late 1950s, the road went from Pierre Part to Paintcourtville, with its southern terminus being near Belle River in Assumption Parish (four miles south of Pierre Part) and northern terminus at LA 1.  In 1958, a swing bridge was built on Belle River, and the road was extended southward to parallel the Atchafalaya River through Lower St. Martin and upper St. Mary Parish to reach Morgan City.  

The northern extension of LA 70 from Paincourtville/Plattenville to Sorrento/I-10 occurred in 1977.  The road was extended from LA 1, crossing Bayou Lafourche, to LA 3089.  LA 70 then assumed most of LA 3089's original routing, crossing the Sunshine Bridge to connect to LA 22 near I-10 in Sorrento.

Major junctions

Louisiana Highway 70 Spur

LA 70 Spur is a  connector route between LA 70 and LA 1 in Plattenville.  The route was created in 1977 with the extension of LA 70 from Paincourtville to the Sunshine Bridge as a bypass from Paincourtville to provide a more direct route to LA 1 and LA 308 and interests in Assumption Parish and southbound.

Major junctions

References

External links

Map of State Highways in Louisiana
Louisiana State Highway Log

0070
Transportation in St. Mary Parish, Louisiana
Transportation in St. Martin Parish, Louisiana
Transportation in Assumption Parish, Louisiana
Transportation in Ascension Parish, Louisiana
Transportation in St. James Parish, Louisiana